Men of War: Red Tide (or Black Jackets) is a real-time strategy and real-time tactics video game and expansion pack to the game Men of War, developed in partnership with Best Way by Digitalmindsoft and published by 1C Company. Game concept and scenario are elaborated by Alexander Zorich, modern Russian writer and scenarist. The game's single player focuses on the Soviet Naval Infantry of the Black Sea Fleet during the Crimean campaign. The arsenals of two more countries, Italy and Romania, are also introduced to the series.

Gameplay
Most of the gameplay features from the first Men Of War were reused in Red Tide, with several small bug fixes and tweaks to make it more enjoyable. In campaign mode, missions are generally longer and more difficult than the ones in its predecessor.

The Soviet Union is the only playable faction in campaign mode. Other factions (Italy, Germany and Romania) can be used in the editor. The editor is only accessible through some work with the games files. Red Tide does not include a multiplayer mode however. Men Of War: Red Tide features one of the largest campaigns in the series with a total of 28 missions divided into 6 campaigns. There is also a large historical encyclopedia with information on the Black Sea Fleet and the battles for Odessa, Sevastopol, etc.

Plot
The game is divided into 6 campaigns. Each mission represents 1 or several battles and starts with an intro to the scene. The first mission of the campaign also has an intro informing the player of the historical situation.
Campaign I: Odessa Must be Ours.
Campaign II: The Crimean Offensive
Campaign III: Manstein's Big Guns
Campaign IV: Breaching the Blue Line
Campaign V: Company of Heroes
Campaign VI

Reception
Men of War: Red Tide has received mixed reviews. It received a Metacritic score of 74 based on seven reviews. Absolute Games gave the game a score of 75, stating that "A good single-player campaign is a rarity these days". GameShark gave it a score of 50, stating that while the "solo game is decent", it loses its edge without the multiplayer ability. Jim Rossignol of Rock, Paper, Shotgun had praised the voice acting in the game.

References

External links

2009 video games
1C Company games
Real-time strategy video games
Real-time tactics video games
Video games developed in Russia
Windows-only games
Windows games
World War II video games
Aspyr games
Single-player video games